Leslie Wolfsberger (born February 5, 1959) is an American gymnast. She competed in six events at the 1976 Summer Olympics.

References

External links
 

1959 births
Living people
American female artistic gymnasts
Olympic gymnasts of the United States
Gymnasts at the 1976 Summer Olympics
People from Avon Park, Florida
21st-century American women